The 2015–16 season of the OK Liga is the 47th season of top-tier rink hockey in Spain.

Teams

Every team from Catalonia unless otherwise noted.

Standings

Top goalscorers

Copa del Rey

The 2016 Copa del Rey was the 73rd edition of the Spanish men's roller hockey cup. It was played at the Pavelló d'Esports de Reus between the eight first qualified teams after the first half of the season.

Barcelona Lassa won its 20th cup.

Quarter-finals

Semifinals

Final

Supercopa de España

The 2015 Supercopa de España was the 12th edition of the Spanish men's roller hockey cup. It was played in Vic.

Barcelona achieved its ninth title, the fifth consecutive.

References

External links
Real Federación Española de Patinaje

OK Liga seasons
2015 in roller hockey
2016 in roller hockey
2015 in Spanish sport
2016 in Spanish sport